Altynshash Jaganova (Kazakh: Жағанова Алтыншаш Қайыржанқызы), born 29 December 1943, Astrakhan District, Akmola Region, Kazakh SSR is a novelist, journalist, playwright, public activist, former Soviet and Kazakh politician. Since 1988, editor-in-chief of the journal "Kazakhstan Ayelderi". Honored Figure of Kazakhstan (2000).

Biography 
Altynshash Jaganova was born on 23 December 1943 in Astrakhan District, Akmola Region, Kazakh SSR. In 1974, she graduated from the Maxim Gorky Literature Institute with a degree in literature.

Career 
 High School Teacher (1961);

 Instructor of the district committee, Tselinograd Regional Committee of the Leninist Communist Youth Union of Kazakhstan (1961-1964);

 Editor of the Tselinograd Regional Television (1964);

 Editor of the publishing house "Kazakhstan" (1965-1970);

 Head of the editorial office of the publishing house "Zhazushy" (1970-1976);

 Editor-in-Chief of Goskino KazSSR (1976-1982);

 Editor-in-Chief of the New Film magazine (1982-1987);

 Instructor of the Central Committee of the Communist Party of Kazakhstan (1987-1988);

 Deputy of the Almaty City Council of People's Deputies (1990);

 Editor-in-Chief of the magazine "Kazakhstan Ayelderi" (1988-1994);

 Deputy of the Supreme Council of the Republic of Kazakhstan of the 12th (from the women's councils united by the Kazakh Republican Council of Women) and 13th convocations, Chairman of the Committee of the Supreme Council of the Republic of Kazakhstan on Women's Affairs, Family Protection, Motherhood and Childhood (1990-1993), Chairman of the Committee of the Supreme Council of the Republic of Kazakhstan on Culture, Press, Mass Media and Public Associations (1994-1995);

 Editor-in-Chief of the magazine "Kazakhstan Ayelderi" (1995-1999);

 Editor-in-Chief of the Amazon magazine (1997-1999);

 Chairman of the Agency for Migration and Demographics of Kazakhstan (03.1999-04.11.2004);

 Head of the Section on Democratization and Development of Civil Society of the Public Chamber under the Mazhilis of the Parliament of Kazakhstan (since 20.11.2007);

Party membership 
 Chairman of the Party of Revival of Kazakhstan (01.1995-10.2003);

Rukhaniyat party 
In 1995 Alytnshash Jaganova founded and led a Rukhaniyat Party. On 30 October 2003, it was registered by the Ministry of Justice of Kazakhstan. The aim of the new party was to promote civil and interethnic harmony.
At the seventh party Congress in March 2010, she assumed her position as party leader.
Here is how she commented on her departure from the post of party leader:

According to the new leader of “Rukhaniyat” Serikzhan Mambetalin, Altynshash Jaganova became an honorary member of the party:

In December 2011, she was excluded from the party for slandering its leadership, also she was accused of losing ties with the party and denying its ideology. Earlier, Altynshash Jaganova declared the illegality of nominating candidates for deputies of the parliament from the Rukhaniyat party, referring to the fact that she has the seal and documents of the party.
In 2012 During the congress of "Rukhaniyat", Altynshash Jaganova was again elected as a chairman of the party.

Creative 
Altynshash Jaganova is known as an author of a number of publications in the press and stories about the fate of women, friendship and brotherhood. Her first book is «Amina, wolves and the end of the world» (1967), also «Akkoyan - the white hound» (1970), «Minx» (1972),«Echo in a circle». Her plays «It all started with Apa», «Heavy rain», «Those who crossed the line», «Restless woman», «Agony», «Metastasis» were staged on the stages of Kazakh Drama Theater named after M. Auezov, a number of regional theaters and the Uzbek Academic Drama Theater named after Hamza. According to her script, a full-length feature film "Muslima" was shot, as well as a performance was staged at the German Drama Theater in Almaty.

Awards and titles 
 Order of Kurmet (15.12.2008) .
 Medals
 Honoured figure of Kazakhstan (2000)

Family 
 First husband — Askar Suleimenov (1938—1992), Soviet and Kazakh writer, literary critic, playwright. Laureate of the State Prize of the Republic of Kazakhstan (1996).
 Son — Alisher Askarovich Suleimenov (born 1965), Kazakh film actor, director. Laureate of the prize of the Youth Union of the Republic of Kazakhstan.
 Daughter — Karakoz Askarovna Suleimenova (born 1967), Kazakh film and theater actress, TV presenter. Honored Worker of the Republic of Kazakhstan, laureate of the State Prize "Daryn", knight of the Order of Kurmet.
 Her second husband is Anes Tulendievich Saray (born 1937), a Soviet and Kazakh writer, playwright, and journalist. Laureate of the State Prize of the Republic of Kazakhstan (1992). Honored Worker of Kazakhstan (2002).

References 

1943 births
Living people
Russian women novelists
Russian dramatists and playwrights
Russian activists
Maxim Gorky Literature Institute alumni